St. Margrethen railway station is a railway station in St. Margrethen, in the Swiss canton of St. Gallen. It is an intermediate stop on the Chur–Rorschach line and the western terminus of the St. Margrethen–Lauterach line to Austria.

Services 
 the following services stop at St. Margrethen:

 EuroCity: six trains per day between Zürich Hauptbahnhof and München Hauptbahnhof.
 St. Gallen S-Bahn:
 : hourly service between Nesslau-Neu St. Johann and Altstätten SG.
 : hourly service toward  and Sargans (circular operation).
 : hourly service to Weinfelden.
 Vorarlberg S-Bahn : on weekdays, half-hourly service to Bregenz; service is hourly on weekends.

References

External links 
 
 

Railway stations in the canton of St. Gallen
Swiss Federal Railways stations
Vorarlberg S-Bahn stations